Jamaican Funk—Canadian Style is the debut album of Canadian emcee Michie Mee, in collaboration with DJ L.A. Luv, released May 14, 1991. It was released on First Priority/Atlantic Records in the United States, where 60,000 copies were sold. The album, which also featured dancehall reggae music, was nominated for Rap Recording of the Year at the 1992 Juno Awards. The only single, "Jamaican Funk," was released in 1990.

Track listing
"Prelude No. 1" – 0:26
"Jamaican Funk—Canadian Style" – 3:34
"Kotch" (featuring Pinchers) – 3:50
"Insecure Luva" – 4:45
"Prelude No. 2" – 0:27 
"If Only They Knew" – 3:53
"Prelude No. 3" – 0:16 
"All-Night Stand" (featuring Shabba Ranks) – 3:49
"We've Arrived in America" – 3:21
"L.A. Luv de Bout" – 3:38
"You're Feisty" – 4:36
"A Portion from Up North" – 4:42 
"Canada Large" – 3:57Bonus tracks 
"Get It Together" – 4:46
"Jamaican Funk" – 3:17

References

1991 debut albums
Atlantic Records albums
Michie Mee albums